The following are the national records in speed skating in Switzerland maintained by the Schweizer Eislauf-Verband (SEV).

Men

Women

References

External links
 SEV web site
 Swiss records

National records in speed skating
Records
Speed skating
Speed skating-related lists
Speed skating